Spialia orbifer, the orbed red-underwing skipper or Hungarian skipper is a butterfly of the family Hesperiidae. It is found from south-eastern Europe and temperate Asia to Korea. The habitat consists of steppe on plains and grassy slopes in the mountains.

This has sometimes been treated as a subspecies of Spialia sertorius but can be distinguished by the olive green (rather than reddish-brown) underside of the hindwing.

The wingspan is 24–28 mm. Adults are on wing from April to August in one or two generations per year.

The larvae feed on Rubus idaeus, Sanguisorba officinalis, Sanguisorba minor and Potentilla gelida.

Subspecies
Spialia orbifer orbifer (South-eastern Europe to south-western Siberia, northern Iran and Sicily)
Spialia orbifer hilaris (Staudinger, 1901) (south-eastern Turkey to Lebanon, Israel, Jordan, northern Iraq and western Iran)
Spialia orbifer carnea (Reverdin, 1927) (Afghanistan, Baluchistan, Chitral)
Spialia orbifer lugens (Staudinger, 1886) (Tian-Shan, north-eastern Iran, Transcaspia, southern Siberia to the Amur region)
Spialia orbifer pseudolugens P. Gorbunov, 1995 (Altai, southern Urals)

References
Whalley, Paul - Mitchell Beazley Guide to Butterflies (1981, reprinted 1992)

External links
Lepiforum.de

Spialia
Butterflies described in 1823
Butterflies of Asia
Butterflies of Europe